Tyewhoppety is an unincorporated community located in Todd County, Kentucky, United States.

The etymology of the community's name is unknown; it may refer to a slang term for an "unkempt, ill-appearing person" or a Shawnee word meaning "place of no return". Tyewhoppety was declared the "most difficult to pronounce" place name in the state of Kentucky by Reader's Digest.

References

Unincorporated communities in Todd County, Kentucky
Unincorporated communities in Kentucky